Binandere is a Papuan language spoken in the "tail" of Papua New Guinea.

Phonology
Binandere has 11 consonants: voiced and voiceless bilabials, alveolars, and velars; voiced labial and alveolar nasals; the flap /ɾ/; the voiced bilabial fricative /β/ and the palatal approximant /j/.

 

Binandere also has the 5 common vowels /ɑ e i o u / and their five nasal counterparts.

These vowels can be combined to form up to 11 possible diphthongs:
 Oral: /iu/ /ei/ /eo/ /eu/ /ɑi/ /ɑe/ /ɑo/ /ɑu/ /oi/ /oe/ /ou/
 Nasal: /ẽĩ/ /ɑ̃ĩ/ /ɑ̃õ/ /õũ/

Evolution

Below are some reflexes of proto-Trans-New Guinea proposed by Pawley (2012):

References

External links
Doregari Kotopu Anglican Holy Communion in Binandere, digitized by Richard Mammana and Charles Wohlers
Benunu tepo ae sakrament da kandoari ae ekalesia da jimbo nenei ainda book England da ekalesia da jimbo ango (1959) Book of Common Prayer digitized by Richard Mammana
King, Copland. 1927. Grammar and Dictionary of the Binandere Language, Mamba River, North Division, Papua. Sydney: D.S. Ford. 

Languages of Oro Province
Greater Binanderean languages